The Musta‘lī are a branch of Isma'ilism named for their acceptance of al-Musta'li as the legitimate nineteenth Fatimid caliph and legitimate successor to his father, al-Mustansir Billah. In contrast, the Nizari—the other living branch of Ismailism, presently led by Aga Khan IV—believe the nineteenth caliph was al-Musta'li's elder brother, Nizar. Isma'ilism is a branch of Shia Islam.

The Musta'li originated in Fatimid-ruled Egypt, later moved its religious center to Yemen, and gained a foothold in 11th-century Western India through missionaries.

The Tayyibi and the Hafizi 
Historically, there was a distinction between the Tayyibi and the Hafizi Musta'lis, the former recognizing at-Tayyib Abu'l-Qasim as the legitimate heir of the Imamate after al-Amir bi-Ahkam Allah and the latter following al-Hafiz, who was enthroned as caliph. The Hafizi view lost all support following the downfall of the Fatimid Caliphate: current-day Musta'lis are all Tayyibi.

Most Musta'li are Bohras, and the largest Bohra group is the Dawoodi Bohra, who are primarily found in India. The name Bohra is a reinterpretation of the Gujarati word vahaurau "to trade". The Bohra comprise two principal groups: a chiefly merchant class Shi'i majority and a Sunni Bohra minority who are mainly peasant farmers.

Syedna Mohammed Burhanuddin was the 52nd Da'i al-Mutlaq of the Dawoodi Bohra community. After his passing in 2014, Syedna Mufaddal Saifuddin succeeded him and serves as the 53rd Da'i al-Mutlaq of The Dawoodi Bohra community.

History
According to Musta'lī tradition, after the death of al-Amir bi-Ahkam Allah, his infant son, At-Tayyib Abu'l-Qasim, about two years old, was protected by Arwa al-Sulayhi who died in 1138, wife of the chief Fatimid Da'i of Yemen. She had been promoted to the post of Hujjat al-Islam long before by al-Mustansir Billah when her husband died and ran the Fatimid dawah from Yemen in the name of Imam At-Tayyib Abu'l-Qasim. During her leadership At-Tayyib Abu'l-Qasim went into occultation so she instituted the office of Da'i al-Mutlaq. Zoeb bin Moosa was first to be instituted to this office and the line of Tayyibi Da'is that began in 1132 has passed from one Da'i to another up to the present day. Arwa al-Sulayhi was the Hujjah in Yemen from the time of Imam Al-Mustansir Billah. She appointed the Da'i in Yemen to run religious affairs. Isma'ili missionaries Ahmed and Abdullah (in about 1067 AD (460 AH)) were also sent to India in that time. They sent Syedi Nuruddin to Dongaon to look after southern part and Syedi Fakhruddin to East Rajasthan, India.

Branches
There is also a community of Sunni Bohra in India. In the fifteenth century, there was schism in the Bohra community of Patan in Gujarat as a large number converted from Musta'li Isma'ili Shia to mainstream Hanafi Sunni Islam. The leader of this conversion movement to Sunni was Syed Jafar Ahmad Shirazi who also had the support of the Mughal governor of Gujarat. 
In 1592, a leadership struggle caused the Ṭayyibi Ismailis to split.  Following the death of the 26th Dai in 1591 CE, Sulayman bin Hassan, the grandson of the 24th Dai, was wali in Yemen and claimed the succession, supported by a few Bohras from Yemen and India. However, most Bohras denied his claim of nass, declaring that the supporting document evidence was forged. The two factions separated, with the followers of Suleman Bin Hasan becoming the Sulaymanis named after Sulayman ibn Hassan and mainly located in Yemen and Saudi Arabia, and the followers of Syedna Dawood Bin Qutubshah becoming the Dawoodi Bohra. Dawoodi Bohra, found mostly in the Indian subcontinent. 
 A split in 1637 from the Dawoodi Bohra resulted in the Alavi Bohra. 
 The Hebtiahs Bohra are a branch of Musta'li Isma'ili Shi'a Islam that broke off from the mainstream Dawoodi Bohra after the death of the 39th Da'i al-Mutlaq in 1754. 
 The Atba-e-Malak community are a branch of Musta'ali Isma'ili Shi'a Islam that broke off from the mainstream Dawoodi Bohra after the death of the 46th Da'i al-Mutlaq, under the leadership of Abdul Hussain Jivaji in 1840. They have further split into two more branches:
 Atba-e-Malak Badar – The current leader is Maulana Muhammad Amiruddin Malak Saheb.
 Atba-e-Malak Vakil – Their current leader is Tayyebhai Razzak.
 The Progressive Dawoodi Bohra is a reformist sect within Musta'li Ismai'li Shi'a Islam that broke off circa 1977. They disagree with mainstream Dawoodi Bohra, as led by the Da'i al-Mutlaq, on doctrinal, economic and social issues.
 Taher Fakhruddin is a claimant to the title of Dai al-Mutlaq since 2016. In 2014 following the death of Mohammed Burhanuddin, there was a succession dispute over who became the 53rd Da'i al-Mutlaq. This dispute has not been resolved and Dr. Syedna Mufaddal Saifuddin has been claimed as the 53rd Da'i al-Mutlaq.

Musta'li Imams
According to Musta'li belief, the line of Imams, descendants of Ali and hereditary successors to Muhammad in his role of legitimate leader of the community of Muslim believers, follows:

Hasan ibn Ali 625–670 (imam 660–670)
Husayn ibn Ali 626–680 (imam 670–680 )
Ali ibn Husayn Zayn al-Abidinm 659–712 (imam 680–712)
Muhammad al-Baqir 676–743 (imam 712–743)
Ja'far al-Sadiq 702–765 (imam 743–765)
Isma'il ibn Ja'far 719/722–775 (imam 765–775)
Muhammad ibn Isma'il 740–813 (imam 775–813)
Abadullah ibn Muhammad (Ahmad al-Wafi)  766–829 (imam 813–829)
Ahmad ibn Abadullah (Muhammad at-Taqi) 790–840 (imam 829–840)
Husayn ibn Ahmad (Radi Abdullah) (imam 840–909)
Abdallah al-Mahdi Billah (909–934)
al-Qa'im bi-Amr Allah (934–946)
al-Mansur bi-Nasr Allah (946–953)
al-Mu'izz li-Din Allah (953–975)
al-Aziz Billah (975–996)
al-Hakim bi-Amr Allah (996–1021)
al-Zahir li-i'zaz Din Allah (1021–1036)
al-Mustansir Billah  (1036–1094)
al-Musta'li Billah  (1094–1101)
al-Amir bi-Ahkam Allah (1101–1130)
at-Tayyib Abu'l-Qasim (1130–1132)

Imams one through five are well-known historical figures in the early history of Islam who are also revered by Twelvers. The Imams numbered 11–21 are the Imam-Caliphs that ruled the Fatimid Caliphate.

The imams from Muhammad ibn Isma'il onward were occulted by the Musta'li; their names as listed by Dawoodi Bohra religious books are listed above.

Followers of the Musta'li Imams also recite the names of these imams in Dua-e Taqarrub after Salah daily. This tradition is reported to have come from the imams of the Ahl al-Bayt The prayer is as follows in English:

The Musta'li consider their imam and Dais as infallible and sinless, and divinely chosen perpetuators of the true form of Islam. Their Dais are keeping the tradition which was instituted by Arwa al-Sulayhi, wife of the Fatimid Da'i of Yemen, who was instructed and prepared by al-Mustansir and the subsequent Imams for the second period of Occultation. However, in the Musta'li branch, the Dai came to have a similar but more important task. The term Da'i al-Mutlaq literally means "the absolute or unrestricted missionary". This da'i was the only source of the Imām's knowledge after the occultation of al-Qasim in Musta'li thought.

Their ancestors and descendants according to Ismā'īlī-Mustā'lī Imāmah doctrine 

{{Tree chart|boxstyle=background:#dfd;| | | | | | | | | | | | | | | | | | CFR |y| FHA | | | | | | | | | | |ZYN=Ali Zaynal-‘Āb’i-Dīn|ÜFV=Umm Farwah bint al-Qasim|İBZ=Ismā‘il ibn Hassan|MHM=Muhammad al-Nafs al-Zakiyya|FHA=Fatima bint al-Hussain'l-Athrambin al-Ḥasan bin Ali|CFR=Jāʿfar al-Sādiq(Imamāh‘Shi'ā)|HRZ=Hasan ibn Zayd’ûl-Alavī (Tabaristan)|ABS=Abbasids|HBK=Hamīdah al-Barbariyyah Khātūn|ABC=ʿAbd Allāh ibn Jāʿfar}}

Da'is

Arwa al-Sulayhi was the Hujjah from the time of Imam Mustansir. She appointed Dai in Yemen to run religious affair. Ismaili missionaries Ahmed and Abdullah (in about 1067 AD (460 AH)) were sent to India in that time. According to Fatimid tradition, after the death of Al-Amir bi-Ahkami'l-Lah, Arwa al-Sulayhi instituted the Da'i al-Mutlaq in place of Dai to run the independent dawah from Yemen in the name of Imam Taiyab. The Dais are appointed one after other in the same philosophy of nass (nomination by predecessor) as done by earlier imams. It is believed that God's representative cannot die before appointing his true successor. This is being followed from the time of 3rd Imam Ali ibn Husayn Zayn al-Abidin, the strong army of Yazid also could not think of killing him, although they did not spare even a child of six months, Ali al-Asghar ibn Husayn.

On the similar belief, the Musta'li think and their Da'i claim, that one day their Imam Tayyib's heir will again reappear as Imam (as happened with the eleventh Imam, Abdallah al-Mahdi Billah, who appeared after period of 150 years since the sixth Imam).

Under the fifteenth Imam, Al-Aziz Billah, the fifth Fatimid caliph, religious tolerance was given great importance. As a small Shi'i group ruling over a majority Sunni population with a Christian minority also, the Fatimid caliphs were careful to respect the sentiments of people. One of the viziers of Imam Aziz was Christian, and high offices were held by both Shia and Sunnis. Fatimid advancement in state offices was based more on merit than on heredity.

Al-Aziz Billah rebuilt the Saint Mercurius Church in Coptic Cairo near Fustat and encouraged public theological debate between the chief Fatimid qadi and the bishops of Oriental Orthodoxy in the interest of ecumenism.

Profession of faith

As is the case with the majority of the Shia, Ismailis conclude the Shahada with ʿAliyun waliyu l-Lah ("Ali is the friend of God"). Musta'lis recite the following shahada:

The first part of this shahada is common to all Muslims and is the fundamental declaration of tawhid. The wording of the last phrase is specific to the Musta'li.

The second phrase describes the principle of Prophecy in Shia Islam.

The third phrase describes the Musta'li theological position of the role of Ali.

References

Further reading
 The Dawoodi Bohras: an anthropological perspective, by Shibani Roy. Published by B. R. Publishing, 1984.
 Mullahs on the mainframe: Islam and modernity among the Daudi Bohras, by Jonah Blank. University of Chicago Press, 2001. .Excerpts
 A Short History of the Ismailis, by Farhad Daftary
 The Ismaili, Their History and Doctrine, by Farhad Daftary
 Medieval Islamic Civilisation, by Joseph W. Meri, Jere l. Bacharach
 Sayyida Hurra: The Isma‘ili Sulayhid Queen of Yemen, by Dr Farhad Daftary
 Cosmology and authority in medieval Ismailism, by Simonetta Calderini
 Religion, learning, and science in the ʻAbbasid period'', by M. J. L. Young, John Derek Latham, Robert Bertram Serjeant

External links
 Dawoodi Bohras (operated by Mufaddal Saifuddin faction)
 Official website of Alavi Bohras
 Dawoodi Bohras (operated by Khuzaima Qutbuddin/Taher Fakhruddin faction)
 History of Ismailis
 The post-Fatimid period